Gassi Touil is a large natural gas field in the Sahara Desert region of Grand Erg Oriental of Algeria, within the commune of Hassi Messaoud. It is an outlying part of the Berkine Basin, itself a region of the Ghadames Basin that extends into Tunisia. The land surface is dominated by extensive sand dune fields.

Gassi Touil is the site of a major liquefied natural gas development project, in which natural gas extracted from the Gassi Touil field will be piped to a liquefaction plant at Djedid. The project was initially developed by Spanish firms Repsol and Gas Natural, but their contract was terminated in 2007 by the Algerian state oil company Sonatrach, which elected to pursue the project on its own.

On November 6, 1961, a gas well fire broke out at Gassi Touil, becoming known as the Devil's Cigarette Lighter. It was finally extinguished on April 28, 1962, by well fire specialist Red Adair.

The field also produces oil, first discovered in 1961, from 38 wells as of 2008.

References

Natural gas fields in Algeria
Oil fields in Algeria